Svorkmo Station is a former railway station on the Thamshavn Line, located in the village of Svorkmo in the municipality of Orkland in Trøndelag county, Norway. The station is located along the river Orkla.

References

Orkland
Railway stations in Trøndelag
Railway stations on the Thamshavn Line
Railway stations opened in 1908
Railway stations closed in 1963
Disused railway stations in Norway
1908 establishments in Norway
1963 disestablishments in Norway